is a railway station on the East Japan Railway Company (JR East) Tsugaru Line located in the city of Aomori, Aomori Prefecture, Japan. The station is on the border between the city of Aomori and the town of Yomogita, and “Nakazawa” is a place name within Yomogita.

Lines

Station layout
Nakasawa Station has one side platform and one island platform serving three tracks, connected by a footbridge. The station is unattended. There is no station building, but only a weather shelter on Platform 1.

Platforms
 

Some limited express trains, including Hokutosei, stop at this station without embarkment or disembarkment for siding.

History
Nakasawa Station was opened on November 25, 1959 as a station on the Japanese National Railways (JNR). With the privatization of the JNR on April 1, 1987, it came under the operational control of JR East. A siding track was added in March 1988.

Surrounding area

See also
 List of railway stations in Japan

External links

 

Stations of East Japan Railway Company
Railway stations in Aomori Prefecture
Tsugaru Line
Aomori (city)
Railway stations in Japan opened in 1959